Applied Science University was a Jordanian professional basketball club based in Amman, Jordan. The team competed in the Jordanian Premier Basketball League for 7 seasons from 2008 until 2015.  In 2009, they finished 2–4 to earn third place in the federation. The team has been disbanded in 2015. The team won four Jordanian Championships.

Honours
Jordanian Premier Basketball League
Champions (4): 2011, 2013, 2014
Jordanian Cup
Winners (2): 2011, 2015
FIBA Asia Champions Cup
Third place (2): 2010, 2013

Notable players

  Zaid Abbaas
  Fadel Al-Najjar
  Islam Abbaas
  Ahmad Al-Dwairi
  Quincy Douby
  Vincent Grier
  Rashaad Singleton

References

External links
on Asia-Basket
Applied Science University website

Basketball teams in Jordan
Basketball team
Basketball teams established in 2008
2008 establishments in Jordan
Sport in Amman